Chemokine (C-C motif) receptor 8, also known as CCR8, is a protein which in humans is encoded by the CCR8 gene. CCR8 has also recently been designated CDw198 (cluster of differentiation w198).

Function 

This gene encodes a member of the beta chemokine receptor family, which is predicted to be a seven transmembrane protein similar to G protein-coupled receptors. Chemokines and their receptors are important for the migration of various cell types into the inflammatory sites. This receptor protein preferentially expresses in the thymus. The ligand of the CCR8 is CCL1. CCL8 also functions as a CCR8 agonist.

Studies of this receptor and its ligands suggested its role in regulation of monocyte chemotaxis and thymic cell apoptosis. More specifically, this receptor may contribute to the proper positioning of activated T cells within the antigenic challenge sites and specialized areas of lymphoid tissues. This gene is located at the chemokine receptor gene cluster region.

See also 
 CC chemokine receptors

References

External links

Further reading 

 
 
 
 
 
 
 
 
 
 
 
 
 
 
 
 
 
 
 

Chemokine receptors
Clusters of differentiation